The 2013 Danish Cup Final was a football match that decided the winner of the 2012–13 Danish Cup. It was played on 9 May 2013 at 15:00 CEST.

Route to the final

Match

Danish Cup Finals
Cup
Danish Cup Final 2013
Danish Cup Final 2013
May 2013 sports events in Europe
Sports competitions in Copenhagen
2013 in Copenhagen